Nicodemus Tessin may refer to:

Nicodemus Tessin the Elder (1615–1681), Swedish architect
Nicodemus Tessin the Younger (1654–1728), Swedish architect